Gerd Menne (14 December 1939 – 29 February 2020) was a German football player and manager who played as a defender.

References

1939 births
2020 deaths
German footballers
Association football defenders
Bundesliga players
FSV Frankfurt players
VfB Stuttgart players
Stuttgarter Kickers players
Royal Antwerp F.C. players
German football managers
Stuttgarter Kickers managers
1. FSV Mainz 05 managers
FC Augsburg managers
SpVgg Ludwigsburg managers
BFV Hassia Bingen managers
Wormatia Worms managers
German expatriate footballers
German expatriate sportspeople in Belgium
Expatriate footballers in Belgium